= Trading stamps in Hong Kong =

Stamp collection is a common practice among retail outlets in Hong Kong. The concept is to allow customers to redeem free gifts or shopping discounts after purchase. The general mechanism is that stamps will be given to customers when their single purchase exceeds a certain amount of money.

Usually, the number of stamps given to customers is directly proportional to the money they spend on that purchase. The more they spend, the more stamps they get. Then, customers can stick the stamps on the collection booklet provided by the shop. When they have collected enough stamps, they can redeem them for products or chances to take part in some activities like lucky draws. The products for redemption may only be available in that particular stamp collection activity. This kind of practice is commonly implemented in different companies in Hong Kong in order to attract customers.

== Rules ==
The practice is popular among supermarkets, convenience stores, restaurants, shopping malls and even gas stations in Hong Kong. There is a large variety of the types of rewards. For different seasons, the stores offer different stamp activities and the goods or rewards are usually exclusive for the activity. Also, there are several ways for customers to claim their rewards by stamp collection.

1. By collecting certain amount of stamps, customers can get free goods like toys or charms. This is usually applicable in the convenience stores in Hong Kong.
2. If customers have fewer stamps collected, they could claim items like cookware or household appliances by paying a higher price. If customers have more stamps collected, they could claim the goods with a lower price or even free of charge. This is usually applicable in supermarkets.
3. Customers are allowed to collect stamps to exchange for cash coupons or shopping discounts. Some shops offer them lucky draws. This is usually applicable in large scale department stores and chain restaurants.

For some shops, extra stamps will be given to customers when they purchase specific items, given that their original purchase exceeds certain amount of money.

== Practices in Hong Kong ==
=== Convenience stores ===
Convenience stores usually offer small toys or charms for customers to redeem by collecting stamps.

=== Supermarkets ===
Supermarkets usually offer household appliances or kitchenware for customers to redeem by collecting stamps. Some shops may also provide shopping coupons for customers to redeem.

=== Chain personal health and beauty retailers ===
Chain personal health and beauty retailers usually offer beddings, daily necessities or kitchenware for customers to redeem by collecting stamps. For certain occasions, some shops will offer several series of products to be redeemed in the same promotion period, and the stamps given to customers are universal for redeeming those products.

=== Chain restaurants ===
Chain restaurants usually offer free food, shopping discounts or lucky draws for customers to redeem by collecting stamps.

== Impacts ==
=== Positive impacts ===
People set up different platforms that can help stamp collectors collect stamps to redeem products. Some online forums allow people to exchange stamps from different shops.

Besides, there is a market of the products from stamp collection because some people may not be able to redeem the whole set of products after the promotion period has passed as they may not have enough or not want to spend time on collecting stamps. Although they might be expensive, the market still appeals to those people who would rather spend their money on those collections.

Stamp system also stimulates sales as people buy more in order to get the stamps. It not only increases the firms’ profit, it may also promote their brand image and positioning. This to some extent helps promote the economic development of those industries.

To some customers, stamp collecting helps save money and increases consumption capacity because they can use the stamps to buy goods at lower price or even redeem free items. This could improve wealth management that they plan on their expenditures.

=== Negative impacts ===
People may overspend for getting stamps since the want to redeem the products. Customers may buy useless items just for getting more stamps.

There were criminal cases related to stamp collection, like stealing stamps in order to redeem the products. Besides, it may also encourage speculation. People may scalp the collections. This could pose an impact on people’s value of consumption.

For the retailers, improper management of the stamp collection activities could cause inconvenience to customers. For example, there were cases of retailers receiving complaint about late treatment of stamp redemption due to stock shortage.
